John Robert McFarlin (August 24, 1907 – September 26, 1947) was an American Negro league first baseman in the 1930s.

A native of Atlanta, Georgia, McFarlin played for the Atlanta Black Crackers in 1932. In three recorded games, he posted two hits in ten plate appearances. McFarlin died in Atlanta in 1947 at age 40.

References

External links
 and Seamheads

1907 births
1947 deaths
Atlanta Black Crackers players